Greeku Veerudu is a 2013 Telugu-language romantic comedy film produced by D. Sivaprasad Reddy on Kamakshi Movies banner, directed by Dasarath. Starring Nagarjuna Akkineni, Nayanthara  and music composed by S. Thaman.

It is dubbed into Tamil and Malayalam as Love Story and in Hindi as America V/s India in 2014 by Goldmines Telefilms. This Movie Was Dubbed In Bhojpuri As Pardesi Balmaa. The film's soundtrack and background score were composed by S. Thaman. The cross over cinema received mixed to positive reviews upon release, and completed a 50-day run on 21 June 2013.

Plot

Chandu is a very selfish, self-made, and cutthroat businessman in New York who runs a successful Event Organizing Agency and is aided by his uncle Sundar, friends Bharath and Maya. Chandu never believes in relationships and family bonding citing them as a mess to discard. He is always involved in romantic activities with many girls sans commitment. Maya loves Chandu but as fate would have it, She marries Kamaraju, an aged yet wealthy doctor to rob his wealth. On the advice of Chandu, she applies for divorce and gets the money from him. However, she realizes that Chandu dumped her and makes a plan to teach him a lesson. She manipulates the terms and conditions of the agreement entered between Chandu and another big businessman PR regarding organizing a charity show. According to the fraudulent terms, since the show was unsuccessful, PR gets every right to recover the whole consignment amount from PR. Chandu lands in financial soup and is desperately in need of Money. Thus, he finally decides to visit his grandparents in India who is hoping to meet him for years.

Chandu recollects his past in the due course. Chandu's father Sanjay opposed his father Ramachandra Prasad and marries an NRI of his choice only to be expelled from the house. After Chandu was born, Sanjay dies. Ramachandra Prasad visits his daughter-in-law and invites her to come to India. After seeing his Maternal Grandfather insisting his mother remarry and his mother replying that she can't do it as she can't forget Sanjay. She tells to Chandu to not indulge in any relationships to avoid the pain and struggle with them. At the airport, he sees Sandhya, a humble doctor who works as a volunteer at Make A Wish Foundation to fulfill the last wishes of the children who are going to die soon. Being a clever scheme maker and soft talker, Chandu becomes friends with Sandhya who is his co-passenger to India. He later goes to his Grandfather's home and studies the situations there. That family consists of His grandparents, their two daughters, their Husbands who are employees in the company Ramakrishna Prasad runs, and their kids. Both the nephews of Ramakrishna Prasad are incapable persons. To avoid some unexpected situations, Chandu lies that he is married. He plans to get 250  million from his father's trust and is successful. But to transfer such an amount proofs should be enclosed that Chandu is married as Ramakrishna Prasad wishes to make Chandu's wife as one of the trustees of the trust.

To Chandu's rescue, Sandhya visits their house to meet Chandu in a friendly meeting. However, the photos of both in the airport make the family misunderstand that Sandhya is Chandu's wife. Chandu takes her to a lonely room and explains the situation. He asks Sandhya to act as his wife to save his Grandparents' life and in turn promises that he would sponsor the three kids who are going to die and are aspiring to make their last wishes come true by Make A Wish Foundation. He also adds that he loved a girl named Maya in New York to avoid further possible complications with Sandhya. Sandhya who is in search of sponsors for the kids accepts his request as it is a noble intention. In the meantime, in certain incidents, Chandu has a change of heart and starts believing in family bonding and relationships and falls in love with Sandhya as he believed that she was the main reason for this change. A scheduled, fake marriage of Chandu and Sandhya is held by Ramakrishna Prasad and his family for the transfer of money and the appointment of Sandhya as the trustee. On the day of leaving back to New York, Chandu feels guilty and tells the whole truth to Ramakrishna Prasad including the fact that Sandhya is not his wife. He asks Ramakrishna Prasad to forgive him and leaves with Sandhya. Ramakrishna Prasad is very happy as he feels that the time when Chandu asked him to forgive him, was the time when his heart fully accepted him albeit their tragic past. Sandhya too leaves back at the New York airport not giving him any chance for Chandu to propose to her.

In New York, Sandhya plans a secret meeting of Chandu with Maya to reunite them as he told her that Maya hated him because of some misunderstandings during their stay in India. There Maya reveals the true colors of Chandu to Sandhya which makes Chandu earn the wrath of Sandhya. Ramakrishna Prasad comes to New York and gives him the necessary amount to clear his debts thus helping him sustain his business. He advises Chandu to prove to Sandhya in their next reunion during the trip of the children by the Make A Wish Foundation that he is a changed man now. He accompanies Sandhya and the kids and along with them, Kamaraju re-enters the scene as the doctor of the kids. Chandu leaves no stone unturned to prove that he is a changed man now and is sincerely in love which goes in vain in front of Sandhya. To fulfill the kids' last wishes, he strives a lot. After fulfilling the second of the 3 wishes, Chandu invites Sandhya for a dinner one day to talk to her which coincidentally marks her birthday. PR arrives at the spot to celebrate Sandhya's birthday but is infuriated after listening to the rambling story between Chandu and Sandhya. As PR is her elder brother, Sandhya promises to marry the guy he approves and Chandu promises that he will never disturb her after the third wish is fulfilled. He risks his life to fulfill the last wish which makes Sandhya believe that Chandu is changed.

To the duo's surprise, PR welcomes them at the airport with his associate Subrahmanyam with whom he arranges the marriage with Sandhya on account of his enmity with Chandu. This makes Chandu much grieved and finally goes back to attend the "Seetha Ramula Kalyanam" event held at the temple in his village in India. Though he promised his family members that he would attend along with Sandhya, the truth is only known to Chandu, Ramakrishna Prasad, and Sundar, who stays back in that village after he falls in love with a local middle-aged woman. To their surprise, Sandhya arrives with her family and Subrahmanyam's family. She promises Chandu to accompany him to the Kalyanam event after PR permits her to go after much recently. Kamaraju lands there unexpectedly and he is the brother-in-law of Subrahmanyam. After some comic situations, all of them unite at the Temple where Chandu tells the truth to his entire family. The family is pleased by him and accepts him, Sandhya accepts his love, and PR and Subrahmanyam forego the previous plans and let Chandu marry Sandhya. The film ends with Chandu and Sandhya participating happily together as a couple in the Kalyanam event to which their families and the rest of the village people attend.

Cast

 Nagarjuna Akkineni as Chandu
 Nayanthara as Sandhya
 Meera Chopra as Maya
 K. Viswanath as Ramakrishna Prasad (Chandu's grandfather)
 Ashish Vidyarthi as PR
 Brahmanandam as Kamaraju
 Kota Srinivasa Rao
 Ali
 M. S. Narayana
 Dharmavarapu Subramanyam
 Venu Madhav 
 Nagineedu 
 Sarath Babu as Sarath 
 Nagababu 
 Raghu Babu
 Dr.Bharath Reddy
 Vennela Kishore as Subrahmanyam
 Sanjay Swaroop as Chandu's father (cameo)
 Benarjee
 Thagubothu Ramesh
 Giridhar as Kedarnath / Badrinath
 Jaya Prakash Reddy
 Y. Kasi Viswanath
 Supreeth
 Srinivasa Reddy 
 Ashok Kumar 
 Jenny
 Geetanjali 
 Sudha
 Kovai Sarala
 Tulasi 
 Lahari
 Pradeep
 Meena  
 Jaya Lakshmi 
 Jayavani 
 Deepthi Vajpai
 Master Abhi 
 Master Gaurav Naidu 
 Master Rakshith Varma 
 Baby Kaveri

Soundtrack

The music was composed by S. Thaman. Music released on ADITYA Music Company.

Production

Development 
The film's title is based on a song from Ninne Pelladata (1996).

Casting
Nagarjuna plays an NRI, Meera Chopra plays one of the key roles. Nayanthara was cast as Nagarjuna's heroine.

Filming
Greeku Veerudu audio has been released on 3 April 2013 at Shilpakala Vedika, Nagarjuna with his entire family has attended the event. After shooting for some portions in Hyderabad, Nagarjuna and team whizzed off to Switzerland on 13 September to shoot for a crucial schedule from 17th onwards. In this schedule, which will be a long one, scenes were to be shot on Nagarjuna and Nayanthara. After the Swiss schedule, the unit moved to United States.

Reception
Greeku Veerudu received positive to mixed reviews from critics, with nearly an average rating of 3.25/5 from most of the sites at reviewbol.com. 123telugu.com gave a review of rating 3/5 stating "Greeku Veerudu is a clean family drama. The film has some good emotional moments and fine performances from Nagarjuna, Nayanathara and Vishwanadh. This is a movie that will appeal more to older sections of the audience." idlebrain.com gave a review of rating 3/5 stating "The title of the film might fool you. Greeku Veerudu title represents heroism. But it's a film with a lot of family orientation. And there is some comedy too. Nagarjuna's look is the major asset of the film." Oneindia Entertainment gave a review of rating 3/5 stating "In nutshell, Greeku Veerudu is a good family entertainer, which has best performances from Nagarjuna, and Nayanthara and sound production values. Although it has some drawbacks, the movie is interesting and enjoyable. Do watch it with your family." SuperGoodMovies gave a review of rating 2.75/5 stating "Greeku Veerudu is a complete family show with a bit of comedy and a very less percentage of mass elements. It is just an above Average movie." APHerald.com gave a review of rating 2/5 stating "Greeku Veerudu is slow, narrated film, it's a one-time watcher. "

References

External links

2013 films
Films shot in Switzerland
2010s Telugu-language films
Indian films set in New York City
Films shot in India
Films shot in New York City
Indian romantic comedy films
2013 romantic comedy films
Films scored by Thaman S